Reuilly is a commune in the Indre department in central France.

It is about 15 km south of Vierzon, and 30 km west of Bourges. The area around Reuilly is noted for its wine; there is a designated Reuilly AOC.

Population

See also
Communes of the Indre department

References

Communes of Indre